The 2022 ATP Lyon Open (also known as the Open Parc Auvergne-Rhône-Alpes Lyon) was a men's tennis tournament played on outdoor clay courts. It was the 5th edition of the Lyon Open and part of the ATP Tour 250 series of the 2022 ATP Tour. It took place in the city of Lyon, France, from 15 May through 21 May 2022.

Champions

Singles

  Cameron Norrie def.  Alex Molčan, 6–3, 6–7(3–7), 6–1

Doubles

  Ivan Dodig /  Austin Krajicek def.  Máximo González /  Marcelo Melo, 6–3, 6–4

Points and prize money

Point distribution

Prize money 

*per team

Singles main draw entrants

Seeds 

 Rankings are as of May 9, 2022.

Other entrants 
The following players received wildcards into the singles main draw:
  Hugo Gaston
  Lucas Pouille
  Jo-Wilfried Tsonga

The following player received entry using a protected ranking into the singles main draw:
  Aljaž Bedene

The following players received entry from the qualifying draw:
  Grégoire Barrère
  Tomás Martín Etcheverry 
  Manuel Guinard
  Gilles Simon

The following players received entry as lucky losers:
  Michael Mmoh
  Yosuke Watanuki

Withdrawals 
 Before the tournament
  Benjamin Bonzi → replaced by  Yosuke Watanuki
  David Goffin → replaced by  Holger Rune
  Gaël Monfils → replaced by  Michael Mmoh
  Lorenzo Musetti → replaced by  Kwon Soon-woo

Doubles main draw entrants

Seeds

 Rankings are as of May 9, 2022.

Other entrants
The following pairs received wildcards into the doubles main draw:
  Ugo Blanchet /  Albano Olivetti
  Ugo Humbert /  Tristan Lamasine

The following pair received entry as alternates:
  Jonathan Eysseric /  Adrian Mannarino
  Max Schnur /  Artem Sitak

Withdrawals
  Daniel Altmaier /  Oscar Otte
  Francisco Cerúndolo /  Federico Coria → replaced by  Max Schnur /  Artem Sitak

References

External links 
 Official website

2022
2022 ATP Tour
2022 in French tennis
May 2022 sports events in France